is a passenger railway station located in the city of Inabe, Mie Prefecture, Japan, operated by the private railway operator Sangi Railway.

Lines
Ōizumi Station is served by the Hokusei Line, and is located 12.4 kilometres from the terminus of the line at Nishi-Kuwana Station.

Layout
The station consists of a single island platform connected to the station building by a level crossing.

Platforms

Adjacent stations

History
Ōizumi Station was opened on April 1, 2004  as a part of a Mie prefectural proposal to increase the convenience of transportation, and thus many modern and handicapped-friendly facilities are found at the station.

Passenger statistics
In fiscal 2019, the station was used by an average of 270 passengers daily (boarding passengers only).

Surrounding area
Inabe Municipal Azuma Elementary School

See also
List of railway stations in Japan

References

External links

Sangi Railway official home page

Railway stations in Japan opened in 2004
Railway stations in Mie Prefecture
Inabe, Mie